Irma Guadalupe Moreno Ovalles  is a Mexican politician affiliated with the Institutional Revolutionary Party. As of 2014 she served as Deputy of the LIX Legislature of the Mexican Congress representing Sinaloa as replacement of Jesús Vizcarra Calderón.

References

Date of birth unknown
Living people
People from Sinaloa
Women members of the Chamber of Deputies (Mexico)
Institutional Revolutionary Party politicians
Year of birth missing (living people)
Deputies of the LIX Legislature of Mexico
Members of the Chamber of Deputies (Mexico) for Sinaloa